The 2014 ARFU Women's Sevens Series is the 15th edition of Asia's continental sevens tournament for women. It was played over two legs hosted in Hong Kong and Beijing, China. China’s earlier win in Hong Kong and their runners-up position in Beijing earned them the crow of Asian Sevens champions of 2014, with Japan as runners-up and Hong Kong in third place.

Tournaments

Hong Kong 
The first leg of the tournament was held from 22–23 August 2014 at Shek Kip Mei Park, Hong Kong.

Pool stages 

Pool W

Pool X

Knockout stages 
Plate

Cup

China 
The second and last leg was held from 18–19 October 2014 at Beijing, China

Pool stages 

Pool W

Pool X

Knockout stages 
Plate

Cup

Final standings

References 

2014
2014 rugby sevens competitions
2014 in Asian rugby union
2014 in women's rugby union